Jean-Pierre Laffont (born 1935) is a French-American photojournalist, born in Algeria, based in New York City. He was the founding member of Gamma USA and Sygma, the largest photography agency in the world, which in 1999 was acquired by the Corbis Corporation.

Biography
Born in Algeria in 1935, Laffont attended high school and college in Morocco, where he graduated in 1955.

In 1959, he received his master's degree in Photography from Europe's prestigious School of Arts et Metiers in Vevey,  Switzerland.

In 1960, Laffont graduated from Military Infantry Academy, in Cherchell (Algeria), where he was a Press Officer, and then proceeded to serve in the French Army as a Commanding Officer in the Oran region in the Algeria War throughout April 1962.
He then returned to Paris, where, from 1962 to 1964, he began assisting photographers Sam Levin and Choura, renowned for their photographs of celebrities and movie stars. It was in this period of time that Laffont started to work in portraiture and fashion photography, and was hired as special photographer on movie sets for MGM in Rome.

In 1965, he arrived in the United States and began his career as a photojournalist, and worked as a staff photographer for Status Magazine.

In 1966, he married Eliane Lucotte and in 1970 they had a daughter, Stephanie, born in Nice (France), who is now a professional artist living in New York City.

Laffont then became the first Foreign Correspondent for Gamma Press Images, and in 1970, with his wife Eliane Laffont, opened the U.S. office of Gamma Press Images agency. Laffont covered historical American events, such as the Civil Rights Movement, the Race Riots, the Vietnam War, the peace movement, as well as the gay and feminist movement.

In 1973, Laffont was one of the co-founders of the Sygma Photo News agency. His work expanded to the coverage of international events in Japan, Korea, Africa, India, China, the Middle East, Poland and the U.S.S.R.
During those years, deeply touched by the suffering endured by children, he, from 1970 to 1980, made a major reportage on child labor throughout the world. The photographs he brought back from those countries were the first global photo essay on child labor and the most eloquent and cruel testimonials. Jean-Pierre has won the most prestigious awards in photojournalism for this series, including the Overseas Press Club's Madeline Dane Ross Award and first prize in the World Press General Picture category.

During the 80's, still photographing around the world, his work particularly focused on the U.S agricultural crisis, scientific research and world economy, mostly in Eastern Europe, the USSR, China, India and Third World countries.
His photographs have been featured in major publications worldwide: Time, Newsweek, The New York Times, Paris Match, Le Figaro Magazine, Stern, Bunte, [[Epoca (magazine)|Época]], The Sunday Times in London and Manchete, his work has also gained high recognition through numerous awards.

In 1999, Corbis acquired Sygma and Jean-Pierre Laffont was appointed General Director of Corbis Sygma in the U.S.
In 2000, he left Corbis and was hired by Hachette Filipacchi Media U.S. as General Manager of Gamma Press USA.

Laffont currently resides in New York City.

Awards and honors 

 1979: World Press Photo: 3rd Prize, General News
 1980: First Prize: New York Newspaper Guild, for "Child Labor"; Overseas Press Club: Madeline Dane Ross Award, for originating the use of photography to raise awareness of child labor conditions around the world.
 1981: Missouri School of Journalism First Prize; Special Recognition Award: World Understanding; World Press Photo: Honorable Mention, News Feature.
 1996: Ordre des Arts et des Lettres (French National Order)

Shows and exhibitions 

 1996 – Visa pour l'Image (Perpignan, France)/ Retrospective
 2012 – Visa pour l'Image (Perpignan, France)/ projection of "Mon Algérie"
 2014 – Photographer's Paradise – Turbulent America 1960–1990, film – Visa pour l’Image, Perpignan, France 
 2015 – Turbulent America, Maison Europeenne de la Photographie (MEP), Paris, France 
 2015 – Photographer's Paradise – Foto Fusion: Cultural Center, Palm Beach, Florida, USA
 2016 – Turbulent America –  Photo Biennale, Central Exhibition Hall Manege, Moscow, Russia
 2016 – Turbulent America, Tri Postal, Lille, France
 2016 – Turbulent America, Pingyao International Photography Festival, Pingyao, China
 2016 – Tumultueuse Amerique, Musee de L'Arsenal, Metz, France 
 2016 – Amérique: Mythes et Légendes, Eglise Saint-Vincent, Merignac, France
 2017 – New York City Up and Down, Projection – Visa Pour l’Image, Perpignan, France 
 2017 – Jean Pierre Laffont, Un Francais à New York – Gallerie de l’Instant, Paris, France
 2017–2018 – Turbulent America, Sous Les Etoiles Gallery, New York City, NY, USA.
 2018 – Laffont's Long March – Beaugeste Gallery, Shanghai, China
 2018 – New York Up and Down – Shenzhen Photo Festival, Shenzhen, China
 2018 – Jean Pierre Laffont New York Down and Out – Leica New York City, NY, USA
 2019 – Jean Pierre Laffont Turbulent America – Candiani, Mestre, Italy.
 2019 – Mes Stars en Amèrique – Les Grandes Recontres Salon de La Photo, Paris, France.
 2020 – Mes Stars en Amèrique – Galerie De L’Instant, Paris, France. 
 2020 – Twenty Five Icons of America by Jean Pierre Laffont online show – Sous Les Etoiles Gallery, New York City, NY, USA.

Publications

Monographs 

 1976 – CB Bible, Porter Bibb (Doubleday)
 1981 – Women of Iron (Playboy)
 2008 – Jean-Pierre Laffont Foreign Correspondent (Editions C.D.P/France)
 2014 – Photographer's Paradise: Turbulent America 1960 – 1990 (JP Laffont Photography/ Glitterati)
 2017 – New York City Up and Down / (Glitterati)
 2019 – Nos Stars en Amèrique Cartes postales de Jean Pierre Laffont / (Editions de La Martinière)

Contributor 

 Contributions to various volumes of A Day in the Life Series (HarperCollins) 
 1986 – The Long March (Intercontinental)
 1989 – Trois Jours en France(Nathan/France)
 1992 – America Then & Now (Cohen/ HarperCollins)
 1999 – Les 100 photos du Siècle (Chêne)
 2003 – America 24/7 in Manhattan (NY State)
 2011 – The New York Times magazine: Photographs (Aperture Foundation)
 2012 – 20 Years, Limited Edition (CDP)
 2013 – 40 Ans de Photojournalisme: Generation Sygma(Martinière/ France)

References

External links 
 
 Corbis: Jean Pierre Laffont

Algerian photojournalists
1935 births
Living people
21st-century Algerian people